Alexandre Girard-Bille (1899–1961) was a Swiss skier. He competed at the 1924 Winter Olympics in Chamonix, where he placed eighth in ski jumping. He also competed in Nordic combined and 18 km cross-country skiing.

References

1899 births
1961 deaths
Swiss male Nordic combined skiers
Swiss male ski jumpers
Swiss male cross-country skiers
Olympic Nordic combined skiers of Switzerland
Olympic cross-country skiers of Switzerland
Olympic ski jumpers of Switzerland
Nordic combined skiers at the 1924 Winter Olympics
Ski jumpers at the 1924 Winter Olympics
Cross-country skiers at the 1924 Winter Olympics